Endnote is the second full-length album by Boston hardcore band The Hope Conspiracy.

Track listing 

2002 albums
The Hope Conspiracy albums
Equal Vision Records albums